The Yacht Club Santo Stefano (YCSS) is a sport club founded in 1960. The first clubhouse was an old brig, called Spluga, moored in the harbor of Porto Santo Stefano, in Italy. This original home, over the years became the meeting place of many important people at that time attending the Argentario peninsula, including the King and Queen of the Netherlands.

Currently the site is hosted at the club house Cortesini in Porto Santo Stefano in the Province of Grosseto.

The burgee of the club consists of a blue triangle with four stars inside: green, red, yellow, white.

The current president is Piero Chiozzi.

Among the events and races organized by the Yacht club we can cite: Pasquavela, which is one of the most important races in the sports landscape of Italian sailing, and the Argentario Sailing Week, held in the beautiful setting of the old port, which involves the historic sailing ships from around the world. It has seen the participation of numerous internationally renowned sailors, such as Germán Frers, Dennis Conner, Ernesto Bertarelli, Doug Peterson and Olin Stephens, all included in the America's Cup Hall of Fame. The club also participates in the organization of the race Trophy of the royal Presidi of Spain  which takes place in the waters of Tuscan Archipelago.

See also 
 Circolo Nautico e della Vela Argentario

References

External links 
Official website

santo Stefano
1960 establishments in Italy
Monte Argentario
Sailing in Tuscany